Patricio Pron (born December 9, 1975) is an Argentine literary writer and critic translated into half a dozen languages including English, German, French and Italian. Granta magazine selected him in 2010 as one of the 22 best young writers in Castilian. He won the twenty-second Alfaguara Novel Prize in 2019 for his work Mañana tendremos otros nombres.

Life and career 
Pron was born in Rosario. He holds a degree in Social Communication from the National University of Rosario and a PhD in Romanesque Philology from the University of Göttingen in Germany.

He began writing in the press in 1992. Between 2000 and 2001 he toured Europe, the Balkans, North Africa and Turkey as a correspondent for the Rosario newspaper La Capital. He currently writes for El País cultural supplement "Babelia" and for the Spanish-Mexican magazine Letras Libres, among other publications.

Between 2002 and 2007, Pron worked as an assistant at the University of Göttingen, where he prepared his doctoral work on the narrative procedures in Copi's work. He moved to Madrid, where he currently lives.

Works

Short stories 

 Hombres infames, Bajo la Luna Nueva, 1999
 El vuelo magnífico de la noche, Colihue, Buenos Aires, 2001
 El mundo sin las personas que lo afean y lo arruinan, Mondadori, Barcelona, 2010
 Trayéndolo todo de regreso a casa. Relatos 1990-2010, El Cuervo, La Paz, 2011
 La vida interior de las plantas de interior, Mondadori, 2013
 Lo que está y no se usa nos fulminará, Literatura Random House, Barcelona, 2018

Novels 

 Formas de morir, Universidad Nacional de Rosario Editora, Rosario, 1998
 Nadadores muertos, Editorial Municipal de Rosario, 2001
 Una puta mierda, El cuenco de plata, Buenos Aires, 2007
 El comienzo de la primavera, Mondadori, Barcelona, 2008
 El espíritu de mis padres sigue subiendo en la lluvia Mondadori, Barcelona, 2011
 English translation: My Father's Ghost is Climbing in the Rain, Knopf, 2013
 Nosotros caminamos en sueños, Literatura Random House, Barcelona, 2014
 No derrames tus lágrimas por nadie que viva en estas calles, Literatura Random House, Barcelona, 2016
 Mañana tendremos otros nombres, Alfaguara, Barcelona, 2019

Others 

 Zerfurchtes Land. Neue Erzählungen aus Argentinien (Tierra devastada. Nuevos relatos desde Argentina), organizer, with Burkhard Pohl
 El libro tachado. Prácticas de la negación y el silencio en la crisis de la literatura, Turner, Madrid, 2014

References

External links 

 Official page
 Patricio Pron articles for Letras Libres (in Spanish)
 Patricio Pron articles for El País (in Spanish)

21st-century Argentine writers
21st-century Argentine male writers
Argentine journalists
Male journalists
20th-century Argentine writers
1975 births
Living people
People from Rosario, Santa Fe
National University of Rosario alumni
University of Göttingen alumni
Argentine expatriates in Spain